The Raŋitoki fragment (Ragitoki, Rangitoki) is a possibly authentic member of the rongorongo corpus.

Location
This fragment is kept in an undisclosed institution.

Description
Red ink on undyed (or at least faded) barkcloth, 4.5 × 15.5 cm. The nine glyphs were apparently painted on the cloth with some kind of brush. The piece is reportedly a strip torn from a skirt/loincloth.

Bark-cloth cloaks and headpieces were indications of high status in the pre-missionary period. Inks used on bark cloth – made from roots, berries and minerals – were apparently rather sophisticated. The cloth was made from the paper mulberry tree, which was formerly prevalent on Eastern Island. It is possible that such items were recycled into more mundane clothing after the arrival of missionaries in 1864, and that the glyphs therefore date to a period when the elite were literate in rongorongo.

Provenance
Given by a Rapa Nui woman, Raŋitoki, to her lover Albrecht van Houten in March 1869. Van Houten had observed that Rapa Nui women wore loincloths adorned with "symbols". Van Houten rolled the fragment into a "scroll", tied it with a piece of twine, and placed it in a pocket-watch case along with a pair of skull-bone beads and a note that has been read,

Ein Stück von dem Rock meiner geliebten wunderschöner Rangitoki. An mich als Geschenk überreicht – März, 1869 –
(A piece from  the skirt of my beloved precious Rangitoki. Given to me as a present – March, 1869 –)

(The word here deciphered as überreicht 'offered/given' is unclear.)

The watchcase was handed down in Van Houten's family in Switzerland until it was put up for auction in 2018. Only when it was evaluated were the symbols on the cloth identified as rongorongo.

Text
The identification of the nine glyphs is not entirely secure. An argument for the authenticity of the text is that the glyphs do not appear to be copies from known texts.

The glyphs, from left to right, have been tentatively identified as,

50 95h [hoch 'raised'] 600 46.76 700 V76 26V 200 95x

References

Robert Schoch & Tomi Melka (2019) The Raŋitoki (Rangitoki) bark-cloth piece: A newly recognized Rongorongo fragment from Easter Island. Asian and African Studies 28:2.
———— (2020) The Raŋitoki (Rangitoki) Fragment: Further analysis of a short Rongorongo sequence on bark-cloth from Easter Island. Asian and African Studies 29:1.

Rongorongo inscriptions